In the theory of probability and statistics, a Bernoulli trial (or binomial trial) is a random experiment with exactly two possible outcomes, "success" and "failure", in which the probability of success is the same every time the experiment is conducted. It is named after Jacob Bernoulli, a 17th-century Swiss mathematician, who analyzed them in his Ars Conjectandi (1713).

The mathematical formalisation of the Bernoulli trial is known as the Bernoulli process. This article offers an elementary introduction to the concept, whereas the article on the Bernoulli process offers a more advanced treatment.

Since a Bernoulli trial has only two possible outcomes, it can be framed as some "yes or no" question. For example:

Is the top card of a shuffled deck an ace?
Was the newborn child a girl? (See human sex ratio.)

Therefore, success and failure are merely labels for the two outcomes, and should not be construed literally. The term "success" in this sense consists in the result meeting specified conditions, not in any moral judgement. More generally, given any probability space, for any event (set of outcomes), one can define a Bernoulli trial, corresponding to whether the event occurred or not (event or complementary event). Examples of Bernoulli trials include:

Flipping a coin. In this context, obverse ("heads") conventionally denotes success and reverse ("tails") denotes failure. A fair coin has the probability of success 0.5 by definition. In this case there are exactly two possible outcomes.
In this case there are six possible outcomes, and the event is a six; the complementary event "not a six" corresponds to the other five possible outcomes.
In conducting a political opinion poll, choosing a voter at random to ascertain whether that voter will vote "yes" in an upcoming referendum.

Definition
Independent repeated trials of an experiment with exactly two possible outcomes are called Bernoulli trials. Call one of the outcomes "success" and the other outcome "failure". Let  be the probability of success in a Bernoulli trial, and  be the probability of failure. Then the probability of success and the probability of failure sum to one, since these are complementary events: "success" and "failure" are mutually exclusive and exhaustive. Thus one has the following relations:

These are multiplicative inverses, so they multiply to 1, with the following relations:

Note that here the odds are computed by dividing the number of outcomes, not the probabilities, but the proportion is the same, since these ratios only differ by multiplying both terms by the same constant factor.

Random variables describing Bernoulli trials are often encoded using the convention that 1 = "success", 0 = "failure".

Closely related to a Bernoulli trial is a binomial experiment, which consists of a fixed number  of statistically independent Bernoulli trials, each with a probability of success , and counts the number of successes.
The probability of exactly  successes in the experiment  is given by:

where  is a binomial coefficient.

Bernoulli trials may also lead to negative binomial distributions (which count the number of successes in a series of repeated Bernoulli trials until a specified number of failures are seen), as well as various other distributions.

When multiple Bernoulli trials are performed, each with its own probability of success, these are sometimes referred to as Poisson trials.

Example: tossing coins
Consider the simple experiment where a fair coin is tossed four times. Find the probability that exactly two of the tosses result in heads.

Solution
For this experiment, let a heads be defined as a success and a tails as a failure. Thus the probability of failure, is given by
.

Using the equation above, the probability of exactly two tosses out of four total tosses resulting in a heads is given by:

See also
Bernoulli scheme
Bernoulli sampling
Bernoulli distribution
Binomial distribution
Binomial coefficient
Binomial proportion confidence interval
Poisson sampling
Sampling design
Coin flipping
Jacob Bernoulli
Fisher's exact test
Boschloo's test

References

External links

Discrete distributions
Coin flipping
Experiment (probability theory)